NBA Live 07 is the 2006 installment of the NBA Live series by EA Sports. It was released on Xbox, Xbox 360, PlayStation 2, PlayStation Portable, and Windows.

Cover
NBA Live 07 features Tracy McGrady of the Houston Rockets as the cover athlete in most versions, but some international versions have players from those areas:

Spain: Pau Gasol
Germany: Dirk Nowitzki
France: Tony Parker & Boris Diaw

Features
Players can create and name players which can be added to the roster. Players can also be upgraded to 99 using a special feature. Although the player can be named in any way, the commentator can speak out their last name if given certain names.

Teams can be unlocked by progressing through the game and completing unique challenges. The game features stars like Magic Johnson, Larry Bird, George Mikan, Wilt Chamberlain, and many others. They are all on one of the All-Star teams, which include the 50s All-Stars, 60s All-Stars, 70s All-Stars, 80s All-Stars, and 90s All-Stars. (The Legend Teams are not available for the Xbox 360)

The game features the voices of Marv Albert and basketball player Steve Kerr. This was the last NBA Live game to be released on the original Xbox. A PlayStation 3 version was cancelled because the design was progressed ambitiously.

Reception

NBA Live 07 received "mixed or average reviews" on all platforms according to video game review aggregator Metacritic. This marks the first time an NBA Live game has been rated in this majority.  In Japan, Famitsu gave the game a score of all four sevens for the PlayStation 2 version; all four eights for the Xbox 360 version; and one seven, one eight, and two sevens for the PSP version.

See also
NBA 2K7

References

External links

2006 video games
Cancelled PlayStation 3 games
Electronic Arts games
NBA Live
PlayStation 2 games
PlayStation Portable games
Xbox games
Xbox 360 games
Windows games
Video games developed in Canada
Video games set in 2006
Video games set in 2007
Mobile games